The Libretto (Italian for "booklet") is a line of subnotebook computers that was designed and produced by Toshiba. The line was distinguished by its combination of functionality and small size, squeezing a full Windows PC into a device the size of a paperback book. The original Libretto line was discontinued in Europe and the U.S. in 1999, but the production continued in Japan with the SS, FF and then the L series until 2002. The first L series Libretto (The L1) was released on 18 May 2001 (in Japan only) and the last (The L5) just 11 Months later on 24 April 2002. Production of all Librettos ceased from 2002 until the release of the Libretto U100 in 2005.

It was a further five years before the Libretto returned again in 2010 with the limited-edition W100 model, a dual-screen tablet.

Models

There were many different models. The first Libretto models, the L20 & L30 used 486 processors from Advanced Micro Devices (AMD) and were only available in Japan (Although the L30 was also assembled and Marketed in South Korea under the Comos Brand name). Beginning with the Libretto 50, Toshiba used the Intel Pentium and later Pentium MMX processors. With the introduction of the L series in 2001, a move was made to the Transmeta Crusoe processor. The U100 of 2005 saw a return to Intel with the use of the Pentium M processor.

The following models were available:

In 2001, Toshiba released the L series range of Librettos. This was the first major change of footprint since the range was first introduced and represented a significant improvement in performance over the previous models, however it also represented a significant increase in overall size. The L series had moved the Libretto range away from what was a UMPC, to that of an early Netbook.

The L1 had built-in USB and IEEE1394 Firewire. The L2 dropped the IEEE1394 in favor of an Ethernet port. The L5 was optionally available with built-in Wifi 802.11b. All models featured a widescreen display with the unusual resolution of 1280×600 pixels.

Like the majority of Librettos models produced, the L series were not officially available outside Japan.

In 2005, Toshiba announced a new model, the Libretto U100:

All three of the above were essentially the same machine but with different options. The U100 was available in Europe in these variants:

 30 GB HDD (with Win XP Home)
 60 GB HDD (with XP Pro), both versions included the DVD dock
 In Japan the clock speed was only 1.1 GHz
 In some markets the DVD dock was an optional or bundled accessory

In 2010, Toshiba announced a new Tablet Libretto model, the W100:

The W100 was released in August 2010, as a limited-edition model and was only available for a short time.  It was available in both English and Japanese versions. There is no VGA port on the W100, the keyboard is virtual (standard, split, or 10-key numeric).  The display can be viewed in portrait or landscape mode, though portrait is limited to one direction of change.  The case has metal top.

References

External links

libretto (world's first dual-screen laptop)
Toshiba Libretto – Toshiba's information page on the new Libretto
Libretto World – Regularly updated Libretto site with forum
CNET Comparison of Latest Libretto Models
Toshiba Libretto W100-U7310 Description and specification Details
Toshiba Libretto 100/110ct – Much information on these models
Toshiba Libretto 100/110CT with 96MB RAM
Toshiba Libretto Information Page – Contains a Libretto FAQ

Libretto
Computer-related introductions in 1996
Subnotebooks